Shivaji Bridge railway station is a small railway station in Connaught Place which is a residential and commercial neighborhood of the New Delhi district of Delhi. Its code is CSB. The station is part of  Delhi Suburban Railway. The station consist of four platforms.

Trains 

 Agra Cantt. - Old Delhi Passenger (UnReserved)
 Sirsa Express
 Hazrat Nizamuddin - Rohtak Passenger (UnReserved)
 Saharanpur Delhi Passenger (UnReserved)
 Rewari Meerut Cantt. Passenger (UnReserved)
 Panipat Ghaziabad MEMU
 Tilak Bridge - Rewari Passenger (UnReserved)
 Rewari - Nizamuddin Passenger (UnReserved)
 Ghaziabad Panipat MEMU
 Kurukshetra Hazrat Nizamuddin MEMU
 Meerut Cantt. - Rewari Passenger (UnReserved)
 New Delhi - Bareilly Intercity Express
 Bulandshahr - Tilak Bridge Passenger (UnReserved)

See also

 Adarsh Nagar metro station
 Hazrat Nizamuddin railway station
 New Delhi Railway Station
 Delhi Junction Railway station
 Anand Vihar Railway Terminal
 Sarai Rohilla Railway Station
 Delhi Metro

References

External links

Railway stations in New Delhi district
Delhi railway division